Zideh may refer to:
 Zideh-ye Bala
 Zideh-ye Pain
 Zideh, Tajikistan